Longitarsus alfierii is a subspecies of beetle in the Galerucinae subfamily that is endemic to Greece.

References

A
Beetles described in 1923
Endemic fauna of Greece
Beetles of Europe